The Sulphur Springs Spartans were an East Texas League baseball team based in Sulphur Springs, Texas that played in 1925. They were managed by Abe Bowman and also featured future Major League Baseball All-Star Sam West.

They did not play the full season, disbanding on June 7.

References

Baseball teams established in 1925
Baseball teams disestablished in 1925
1925 establishments in Texas
1925 disestablishments in Texas
Defunct minor league baseball teams
Defunct baseball teams in Texas
East Texas League teams